Sollières-Sardières is a former commune in the Savoie department in the Auvergne-Rhône-Alpes region in south-eastern France. On 1 January 2017, it was merged into the new commune Val-Cenis. 
It is located the heart of the Alps in the upper Maurienne valley 120 km long. 
Part of the region is within the Vanoise National Park. The remaining land is not included in the protected area called "zone peripherique" which has lesser environmental protection enforcement rules. 
Some flowers can only be found in the heights of the commune and in boreal regions. 
It has a small airstrip ICAO code: LFKD

See also
Communes of the Savoie department

References

Former communes of Savoie